A general election was held in the U.S. state of Alabama on November 4, 2014. All of Alabama's executive officers were up for election as well as a United States Senate seat, and all of Alabama's seven seats in the United States House of Representatives.

Primary elections were held on June 3, 2014, for offices that need to nominate candidates. Primary runoffs, necessary if no candidate won a majority of the vote, were held on July 15.

Governor

Incumbent Republican Governor Robert J. Bentley, who had served in the office since January 17, 2011, ran for re-election to a second term as governor.

He defeated former Morgan County Commissioner Stacy Lee George and retired software company owner and candidate for Mayor of Scottsboro in 2012 Bob Starkey in the Republican primary.

In the Democratic primary, former U.S. Representative Parker Griffith defeated businessman and former professional baseball player Kevin Bass.

Results

Lieutenant governor
In Alabama, the governor and lieutenant governor are elected separately. Incumbent Republican Lieutenant Governor Kay Ivey, who had served in the office since January 17, 2011, ran for re-election to a second term.

Pastor and conservative activist Stan Cooke also ran in the Republican primary.

Former State Representative James C. Fields was the only Democrat running for the office. Scott Ninesling, a fire chief and emergency response supervisor for a liquefied natural gas plant in Angola, had declared his candidacy, but he withdrew before the filing deadline.

Attorney General

Incumbent Republican Attorney General Luther Strange, who had served in the office since January 17, 2011, ran for re-election to a second term.

He was unopposed in the Republican primary. State Representative Joe Hubbard, the great-grandson of former U.S. Senator J. Lister Hill, was the only Democrat running for the office.

Secretary of State
Incumbent Republican Secretary of State James R. Bennett, who had served in the office since July 31, 2013, did not run for re-election, per the terms of his appointment. Bennett, who had previously served as Secretary of State from 1993 to 2003, was appointed to the office following the resignation of Beth Chapman.

Running in the Republican primary were former Montgomery County Probate Judge Reese McKinney, State Representative John Merrill, and Crenshaw County Probate Judge James Perdue.

The only Democrat running was Lula Albert-Kaigler, a retired self-employed worker and candidate for Alabama's 1st congressional district in 2013.

State Auditor

Incumbent Republican State Auditor Samantha Shaw, who had served in the office since January 15, 2007, was term-limited and not eligible to run for re-election to a third term.

Four Republicans ran for their party's nomination: farmer and candidate for Commissioner of Agriculture and Industries in 2010 Dale Peterson, former Deputy Conservation Commissioner Hobbie Sealy, Secretary of State aide Adam Thompson, and former Public Service Commissioner Jim Zeigler. Attorney Ray Bryan had been running on a platform of abolishing the office, but he was disqualified from the ballot by the Alabama Republican Party for missing the deadline to file a financial statement with the Alabama Ethics Commission. He considered running as an Independent, but decided against it.

The only Democrat running was Miranda Joseph, the nominee for State Auditor in 2010.

State Treasurer
Incumbent Republican State Treasurer Young Boozer, who had served in the office since January 17, 2011, was running for re-election to a second term.

Boozer was unopposed in the Republican primary. Democrat Joe Cottle, a lobbyist for the Alabama Education Association, had been running, but withdrew from the race.

Commissioner of Agriculture and Industries
Incumbent Republican Commissioner of Agriculture and Industries John McMillan, who had served in the office since January 17, 2011, was running for re-election to a second term.

McMillan was unopposed in the Republican primary. The only Democrat running was Doug "New Blue" Smith.

Public Service Commission
Both of the Associate Commissioners on the Alabama Public Service Commission are up for election. Republican Jeremy Oden, who was appointed to the Commission by Governor Bentley in December 2012, was running for election to a first full term. Republican Terry L. Dunn, who was first elected in 2010, was running for re-election to a second term.

Oden was challenged in the Republican primary by Kathy Peterson, the wife of Dale Peterson and a candidate for Public Service Commission in 2012. No Democrat filed to run.

Dunn faced three opponents in the Republican primary: Jonathan Barbee, former interim press secretary for the Alabama Republican Party; Chris "Chip" Beeker, former Greene County Commissioner; and Phillip Brown, the Chairman of the Alabama Minority GOP. No Democrat filed to run.

United States Senate

Incumbent Republican Senator Jeff Sessions ran for re-election to a fourth term. No other candidates filed before the deadline and so he was unopposed in the primary and general elections.

United States House of Representatives

All of Alabama's seven seats in the United States House of Representatives were up for election in 2014.

References

External links

 
Alabama
Alabama elections by year